The Höganäs Formation is a Late Triassic to Early Jurassic geologic formation in Skåne, Sweden. The formation is mostly known for its incredible flora collection from the Bjuv member, composed of over 110 species, and also includes several vertebrate remains, such as fishes, amphibians and dinosaur tracks & remains, although none have yet been referred to a specific genus.

Description 
The Höganas Formation was deposited in what is now the southern part of Sweden Skåne. The formation straddles the Triassic-Jurassic boundary and has provided evidence of widespread mire-forest deterioration that began in the latest Rhaetian. The upper part of the Höganas Formation is correlated with the Rønne Formation of Bornholm, which is administered by Denmark. The Hóganas Formation is rich in coal and has provided many fossil flora.

Vallåkra Member
This member represent the basal part of the Formation, that represents a transition between the terrestrial Kågeröd Formation and the delta dominated coal layers of the Bjuv Member, being made by poorly stratified clay & claystone, mostly green in coloration. The sediments of this member are exposed mostly in the quarry of the town of the same name, where is subdivided on the next levels: 6 m of mixed layers, whose composition includes material seen both on the Kågeröd Formation and this member (red clay and 5 m light clay, 3 m argillaceous sandstone and l m dark clay and several layers composed by Spherosiderite). The uppermost levels are covered by the coal seams of the Bjuv Member. This member has been considered as of Middle and Upper Rhaetian in age.

Bjuv Member
The second member is the Bjuv Member, known as the most fossiliferous one, that was known originally as the Gruv Member (gruva= mine). Coal and clay have been mined in this area since the fifteenth century, being this intensive mining one of the main reasons the fossiliferous layers have provided such a diverse flora. The Bjuv member is divided on two different seams, the B seam, that overlies the older member and the A seam, that marks the limit with the Helsingborg Member. This layer has a thickness of around  37.22 and 45.72 m in bore No. 256 (stored at the Höganäs Company in Bjuv) from the Bjuv area. The layer is dominated by coarse arenaceous sediments, specially between Billesholm and Höganäs, parallel to the Söderåsen and Kullaberg horsts. Towards the southern part of this area the deposition changes, with an increased abundance of argillaceous contents, specially at places like Skromberga. The age of this member is considered to be Late Rhaetian-Lower Hettangian. The Plant fossils found at this layer are one of the main fossil material of the whole mesozoic in Sweden, composed by more than 110 species, one of the most complete floras of the same age from any location. The main reason for this datation where suggested due to the presence of the  plants Lepidopteris ottonis and Thaumatopteris shenki, as well palynological samples that suggested a  Middle Rhaetian age (the Rhaetipollis-Limbosporites Miospore Zone). Latter works have fount that the Dinosaur Footprint layers spam between the Rhaetian-Hettangian boundary. Beyond the exceptional flora, the member is also known for fossils of Molluscs, arthropods and fish remains.

Helsingborg Member
The Uppermost member of the formation is entirely of Hettangian age, and is the last layer before the start of the deposition of the younger dominant marine Rya Formation. This member is dominated by Deltaic sediments, along several marine interealatians are frequent, with deposition of coarse, in some cases arkosic sandstones in between
more fine-grained deposits may indicate Early Kimmerian tectonic movements. The member has a maximunn thickness of 215 m and is divided in 2 parts: Höllviken No. 2 indicated that the lower part starts with up to 12 m of kaolinitic clay succeeded by a 15–20 m thick sequence of cross-bedded arkoses and light-coloured clays, being called Boserup beds or Thaumatopteris schenki zone (Pinuspollenites-Trachysporites Miospore Zone). by Lund ( 1977) This beds are known from Boserup, but also from the central part of Helsingborg, the Köpinge No. 3 bore and even extent to the Höganäs region (northwest to Eslöv in the south). This beds are overlain by some metres of arenaceous clays, iron claystone and calcareous sandstone with few intercalation of a coal seam (known as Tågaborg coal seam), where floral remains are also recovered such as Dictyophyllum nilssoni and Equisetites spp.. Then the layers turn into  5 m of argillaceous sandstone and 5 m slightly arenaceous clays, with a last 1 m of calcareous sandstone, on a sequence known from cliff series at Laröd-Sofiero at the north of Helsingborg, with plant remains such as Nilssonia polymorpha and Dictyophyllum nilssoni, referred to the Pinuspallenites-Trachysporites zone. It also appears on Rosendal, Fleninge, Farhult and Klappe. Helsingborg (Vossbäumer I 969). There is a coal seam, Tinkarpsflötsen, in the
middle part of the sequence. The upper part of the Helsingborg Member starts with a 28 m thick sandstone, with a section known as Fleninge beds, that represent layers where marine ingressions were more common, with the last layers of the formation made up of sandstone, claystone and several minor coal seams.

Fossil content

Ichnofossils 

Lockeia siliquaria (Bivalves) 
Planolites annularis (Polychaetes) 
Planolites montanus (Polychaetes)
Diplichnites isp. (Xiphosurans, Insects, Arachnids)
Teichichnus isp. (Polychaetes, Echiurans, Holothurians.)
Skolithos isp. (Polychaetes, Phoronidans)
Monocraterion tentaculatum  (Polychaeta, Sipuncula, Enteropneustans & Echiurans)
Rhizocorallium isp. (Polychaeta, Sipuncula, Enteropneustans & Echiurans)
Aulichnites isp. (Gastropods)
Diplocraterion parallelum (Polychaeta, Sipuncula, Enteropneustans & Echiurans)

Annelida

Bivalves

Insecta

Sharks

Bony Fish

Amphibia

Dinosauria
Tracks discovered in the Höganäs Formation have been assigned to the ichnogenus Grallator (Eubrontes) cf. giganteus, which were discovered in Rhaetian strata, and Grallator (Eubrontes) soltykovensis, which were discovered in Hettangian strata. A few of the tracks were taken to museums, but most of them disappeared in natural floodings.

After the end of a seven-year excavation project at Billesholm, researchers announced on 13 October 2022 the identification of seven dinosaur species based on fossil remains, out of which three species were new to science. The fossils are yet to be analyzed and scientifically published.

See also 
 List of fossiliferous stratigraphic units in Sweden
 List of dinosaur-bearing rock formations
 List of stratigraphic units with indeterminate dinosaur fossils

References

Bibliography 
 
  

Geologic formations of Sweden
Jurassic System of Europe
Triassic System of Europe
Jurassic Sweden
Triassic Sweden
Hettangian Stage
Rhaetian Stage
Sandstone formations
Coal formations
Coal in Sweden
Fluvial deposits
Ichnofossiliferous formations
Paleontology in Sweden
Formations